Diplodactylus pulcher, sometimes called the fine-faced gecko, is a gecko endemic to Australia.

References

Diplodactylus
Reptiles described in 1870
Taxa named by Franz Steindachner
Geckos of Australia